Anna Y. Leon-Guerrero is a sociologist.  She is a professor in the Sociology Department at Pacific Lutheran University.

Education and career 
Leon-Guerrero graduated from Pacific University in 1983 with a BA in communications and sociology.  She went on to University of California, Los Angeles for her graduate work, earning an MA in 1988, and a PhD in sociology in 1993.

Publications 

 Anna Leon-Guerrero. Social Problems: Community, Policy, and Social Action, (7th ed.) (2022). Thousand Oaks: Sage Publishing. 
 Anna Leon-Guerrero, Chava Frankfort-Nachmias, Georgiann Davis. Essentials of Social Statistics for a Diverse Society, (4th ed.) (2020). Thousand Oaks: Sage Publishing. 
 
 Anna Leon-Guerrero, Kristine Zentgraf.(ed.) Contemporary Readings in Social Problems (2008). Thousand Oaks: Sage Publishing.

References 

American women sociologists
University of California, Los Angeles alumni
Pacific University alumni
Pacific Lutheran University faculty
Living people
Year of birth missing (living people)